Jürgen Hahn (born September 23, 1950) is a West German former handball player who competed in the 1976 Summer Olympics.

In 1976 he was part of the West German team which finished fourth in the Olympic tournament. He played all six matches and scored 14 goals.

External links
 profile

1950 births
Living people
West German male handball players
Olympic handball players of West Germany
Handball players at the 1976 Summer Olympics